Lima is a town in Zárate Partido, Buenos Aires Province, Argentina with a population of 8,375.

Populated places in Buenos Aires Province